Agriculture in Belarus can be divided into two segments: livestock production and crop production. Crop production slightly outweighs livestock production in the country's product mix, accounting for around 55% of gross agricultural output since 1995. Agriculture accounted for 7.9% GDP in 2013, while over the same year that sector accounted for only 3% GDP in the EU.

Products of animal origin are mainly pork, beef, and poultry. Belarus has about 1.5 million cows, but the milk yields are relatively low (less than 3,000 kg per cow per year). Belarus's main crop products are barley, rye, oats, and wheat, as well as potatoes, flax, rapeseed, and sugarbeets. Cereals and legumes (mainly barley and rye) take up 41% of sown area and another 43% is under crops used for animal feed. Potatoes and vegetables take up 11% of sown area and industrial crops (sugarbeets, flax, and some rapeseed) the remaining 4%.

Synopsis

Belarus has been characterized by some as a slow land reformer compared to other CIS countries. Nevertheless, the share of traditional collective and state farms in agricultural land decreased from 94% in 1991 to 83% in 2004 as nearly 1 million hectares moved to family farms in the process of transition reforms. The share of family farms in agricultural output increased from less than 25% in 1990 to 40%–50% in the 2000s. The number of so-called peasant farms, which began to emerge alongside the traditional household plots since 1991, reached 2,500 in 2004 with average size of 72 hectares (compared with less than 1 hectare for the average household plot). The number of collective and state farms did not change much, decreasing from 2,500 in 1990 to 2,250 in 2003. Over the decade, the average farm became much smaller. and that allowed the agricultural sector to shed half its labor force between 1990 and 2003, from 896 workers per farm in 1990 to 463 in 2003. Agricultural land remains state-owned, as it was in the Soviet Union, except for the land in the small household plots that has been privatized by special legislation.

There have been no major shifts in the number of animals between collective and family farms since independence in 1995: the family farm sector (mainly household plots) controlled 11%–16% of the total cattle herd and 30%–40% of the number of pigs between 1980 and 2005. Poultry, on the other hand, has become concentrated to a greater extent in collective farms, with the share of family farms dropping from more than 40% in the 1980s to less than 30% since 1995.

The share of agriculture in GDP declined from 11.6% in 2000 to 7.4% in 2007, while the share of agriculture in total employment dropped from 14.1% to 9.9% over the same period. The decrease in agricultural employment is a long-term trend and back in the early 1990s agriculture's share was as high as 19% of the number of employed. The decrease of agricultural labor parallels the general urbanization trends, as the share of rural population in Belarus steadily declines over time.

Production
Belarus produced in 2018:

 5.8 million tons of potato (11th largest producer in the world);
 4.8 million tonnes of sugar beet, which serves to produce sugar and ethanol;
 1.8 million tons of wheat;
 1.1 million tons of maize;
 1 million tons of triticale (3rd largest producer in the world, only behind Poland and Germany);
 944 thousand tons of barley;
 700 thousand tons of apple (19th largest producer in the world);
 502 thousand tons of rye (5th largest producer in the world);
 456 thousand tons of rapeseed;
 360 thousand tons of cabbage;
 346 thousand tons of vegetable;
 341 thousand tons of oats (18th largest producer in the world);
 290 thousand tons of carrot;
 284 thousand tons of tomato;
 240 thousand tons of beans;
 226 thousand tons of cucumber;
 215 thousand tons of onion;

In addition to smaller productions of other agricultural products.

Livestock production
Cereal Production was minimized by commercial farm production of Lupik Villages.

See also
Economy of Belarus

References

Other sources 
CIA World Factbook: Belarus
Library of Congress Country Studies: Belarus
Belarus Digest: Belarus Agriculture: Success Abroad, Failure At Home